The 49th Japan National University Rugby Championship (2012/2013).

Qualifying Teams

Kanto League A (Taiko)
 University of Tsukuba, Teikyo University, Meiji, Waseda University, Keio

Kanto League B
 Tokai University, Ryutsu Keizai University, Takushoku University, Hosei University, Nihon University

Kansai League
 Tenri University, Ritsumeikan University, Kwansei Gakuin University, Kinki University, Osaka University of Health and Sport Sciences

Qualifier
 Fukuoka Institute of Technology

Pool stage
Each team will play each other once in their respective pools. Five points for a win, two for a draw and no points for a loss. Bonus points for four tries (TB) and losing by less than seven points (LB). There is also an additional 'League Bonus Points' (LBP) for the position in their respective qualifying leagues from four points for first place to one point for fourth place.

Pool A

Pool B

Pool C

Pool D

Semi-final

Final

Universities Competing

 Teikyo University
 Waseda
 Meiji
 University of Tsukuba
 Keio University
 Ryutsu Keizai University
 Tokai University
 Takushoku University
 Nihon University
 Hosei University
 Tenri University
 Osaka University of Health and Sport Sciences
 Ritsumeikan University
 Kinki University
 Kwansei Gakuin University
 Fukuoka Institute of Technology

External links
 The 49th Japan University Rugby Championship - JRFU Official Page (Japanese)
 Rugby union in Japan

All-Japan University Rugby Championship
Univ